John Beard may refer to:
 John Beard (artist) (born 1943), Welsh artist and painter
 John Beard (colonial administrator) (died 1685), Chief Agent and Governor of Bengal
 John Beard (embryologist) (1858–1924), Scottish embryologist and anatomist
 John Beard (news anchor) (born 1945), American newscaster and Arrested Development actor
 John Beard (Arrested Development), the character he plays
John Beard (politician) (1797–1876), American politician
 John Beard (tenor) ( 1716–1791), English singer of Handel's operas and oratorios
 John Beard (trade unionist) (1871–1950), British trade unionist and politician
 John F. Beard (1822–1891), Wisconsin legislator
 John Relly Beard (1800–1876), Unitarian minister
 John Stanley Beard (1916–2011), British-born Australian forester and ecologist
 John Stanley Coombe Beard (1890–1970), English architect
 John W. Beard (born 1951), Iowan politician
 John William Beard (1920–2006), member of the California legislature